All Across the City is an album by guitarist Jim Hall recorded in 1988 and released on the Concord Jazz label.

Reception

AllMusic awarded the album 4 stars, with the review by Ken Dryden stating, "Jim Hall's successful blend of contemporary and mainstream jazz should appeal to both camps on this well-crafted CD. Hall displays the subtle quiet lyricism that makes his guitar sound instantly identifiable... One of Jim Hall's best CDs".

Track listing
All compositions by Jim Hall except where noted
 "Beija-Flor" (Nelson Cavaquinho, Noel Silva) – 6:32
 "Bemsha Swing" (Thelonious Monk, Denzil Best) – 5:13
 "Prelude to a Kiss" (Duke Ellington, Irving Gordon, Irving Mills) – 4:51
 "Young One (For Debra)" – 4:27
 "R.E.M. State" (Gil Goldstein) – 5:34
 "Jane" – 4:59
 "All Across the City" – 5:32
 "Drop Shot" – 5:33
 "How Deep Is the Ocean?" (Irving Berlin) – 3:29
 "Something Tells Me" (Jane Hall) – 5:00
 "Big Blues" – 6:25

Personnel
Jim Hall – guitar
Gil Goldstein – keyboards
Steve LaSpina – bass
Terry Clarke – drums

References 

Jim Hall (musician) albums
1989 albums
albums produced by Carl Jefferson
Concord Records albums